Widow's Might  is a 1935 British comedy film directed by Cyril Gardner and starring Laura La Plante,  Yvonne Arnaud and Garry Marsh. Produced by Irving Asher, it is based on a play by Frederick J. Jackson, adapted by Rowland Brown and Brock Williams and filmed by Warner Brothers at Teddington Studios.

Cast
 Laura La Plante - Nancy Tweesdale
 Yvonne Arnaud - Princess Suzanne
 Garry Marsh - Barry Carrington
 George Curzon - Champion
 Barry Clifton - Cyril Monks
 Margaret Yarde - Cook
 Davina Craig - Amelia
 Joan Hickson - Burroughs
 Hugh E. Wright - Peasgood
 Hay Plumb - Sergeant Dawkins

References

External links

1935 films
1935 comedy films
British comedy films
Films directed by Cyril Gardner
British black-and-white films
1930s English-language films
1930s British films